Berthelinia pseudochloris is a species of a sea snail with a shell comprising two separate hinged pieces or valves. It is a marine gastropod mollusc in the family Juliidae.

Distribution
The type locality for this species is Kauai, Hawaii.

Berthelinia pseudochloris is found in Maui, Oahu, Kauai and the French Frigate Shoals.

Description
This species reaches a maximum size of 6 mm. It has a wide, transparent yellow-white shell that has a curved dorsal margin. The animal itself is green in colour with white flecks.

References

Juliidae
Gastropods described in 1964